Rogers Dam is an earth-filled embankment dam on the Muskegon River in Mecosta Township, Michigan, United States. Construction of the dam began in 1905, and its power plant was commissioned in March 1906. Owned and operated by Consumers Energy, the primary purpose of the dam is hydroelectric power generation. On December 22, 1921, the original  power plant was destroyed in a fire. It was rebuilt with an increased  installed capacity in 1922. The rebuild cost approximately $450,000. It is the oldest hydroelectric power plant operated by Consumers Energy who owns the Hardy and Croton dams downstream of Rogers Dam.

References

External links

Dams in Michigan
Earth-filled dams
Dams completed in 1906
Buildings and structures in Mecosta County, Michigan
1906 establishments in Michigan
Energy infrastructure completed in 1922
Hydroelectric power plants in Michigan
Run-of-the-river power stations
Consumers Energy dams